Mishaal bin Hamad bin Khalifa Al Thani (born 2 July 1972) is a member of the House of Thani.

Early life
Sheikh Mishaal is the first son and oldest child of the former Emir of Qatar, Sheikh Hamad bin Khalifa Al Thani, and his first wife, Sheikha Mariam bint Muhammad Al Thani.

Career
Sheikh Mishaal was named as the crown prince on 30 June 1995, three days after his father became the emir. Then he began to work at the ministry of foreign affairs, heading Qatari missions. He served as crown prince until 23 October 1996 when he was replaced by his half-brother Jassim bin Hamad.

He was the chairman of the  Al Rayyan Sports Club, and member of Qatar Racing & Equestrian Club (QREC). He is president of the Arab Equestrian Federation.

Personal life
Sheikh Mishal bin Hamad bin Khalifa Al Thani has three sons and four daughters:

Sons: 
 Sheikh Abdullah bin Mishal bin Hamad Al Thani - Member of Qatar Racing and Equestrian Club (QREC).
 Sheikh Muhammad bin Mishal bin Hamad Al Thani.
 Sheikh Hamad bin Mishal bin Hamad Al Thani.
Daughters: 
 Sheikha Rowdha bint Mishal bin Hamad Al Thani.
 Sheikha Mariam bint Mishal bin Hamad Al Thani.
 Sheikha Aisha bint Mishal bin Hamad Al Thani.
 Sheikha Sara bint Mishal bin Hamad Al Thani.

All members of his family are racehorse owners and closely involved in the Equestrian sports.

Ancestry

References

1972 births
Living people
House of Thani
Heirs apparent who never acceded
Mishaal